Konstantinos "Dinos" Papadimas (born 1932) is a Greek former international professional basketball player. During his club playing career, he played at the shooting guard position.

Professional career
Papadimas was a member of the Panellinios Basketball Club and its famous 1950s era "Chrysi Pentada", or "The Golden Five" in English. With Panellinios, he won 3 Greek League championships, in the years 1953, 1955, and 1957. He also won two European Club Championships with the club, as he won the 1955 Brussels Basketball Tournament and the 1956 San Remo Basketball Tournament. While he was also a runner-up at the 1954 San Remo Tournament.

National team career
Papadimas was a member of the senior men's Greek national basketball team. With Greece, he competed at the 1951 Mediterranean Games, the 1952 Summer Olympic Games, and the 1955 Mediterranean Games, where he won a bronze medal.

References

External links
 Basket.gr 
 Segas.gr 

1932 births
Living people
Basketball players at the 1952 Summer Olympics
Greek men's basketball players
Olympic basketball players of Greece
Panellinios B.C. players
Point guards
Shooting guards
Basketball players at the 1955 Mediterranean Games
Mediterranean Games bronze medalists for Greece
Mediterranean Games medalists in basketball
Basketball players from Athens